Amy Joy Williams,  (born 29 September 1982) is a British former skeleton racer and Olympic gold medallist. Originally a runner, she began training in skeleton in 2002 after trying the sport on a push-start track at the University of Bath. Although unable to qualify for the 2006 Winter Olympics, she was a member of the Great Britain team four years later at the 2010 Games. She won a gold medal, becoming the first British individual gold medallist at a Winter Olympics for 30 years and the only British medallist in those Olympics.

Early life and education
Williams was born in Cambridge and brought up in Bath, being educated at Hayesfield School Technology College, Beechen Cliff School and the University of Bath. Her father, Ian Williams, is a professor of chemistry at the University of Bath, and her mother, Janet Williams, is a former midwife. Williams has a twin sister and an older brother.

Career
Williams was originally a 400m runner but she was unable to qualify for the national athletics team. She began competing in skeleton in 2002 after trying out at a push-start track at the University of Bath. She described her first experience on a skeleton track as exhilarating and terrifying, but she nonetheless enjoyed it and began training in skeleton.

At her first major event, the 2009 World Championships in Lake Placid, she won a silver medal.

Williams was unable to qualify for the 2006 Winter Olympics in Turin, Italy, as Great Britain was only allowed to enter a single skeleton athlete in that year's competition, a spot won by Shelley Rudman, who went on to win the silver medal. Four years later, she qualified for the 2010 Winter Olympics in Vancouver, British Columbia, Canada, where her country was allowed to send two skeleton athletes.

At the 2010 Games, Williams won the gold medal in the women's skeleton, breaking the track record twice along the way and winning by more than a half a second. At the end of the first day, on which Williams had established a 0.3s advantage over second placed Kerstin Szymkowiak, two protests were filed by other nations over the aerodynamics of Williams's helmet. The protests claimed that the helmet's spoilers were illegal and gave her an unfair aerodynamic advantage. The manufacturer claimed that they were integral to the helmet's design. Both protests were rejected by the International Bobsleigh and Tobogganing Federation, which had passed the helmet—with ridges—days earlier.

Williams became the first British gold medallist in an individual event at the Winter Olympics for 30 years, following Robin Cousins's victory in figure skating at the 1980 Winter Olympics in Lake Placid, and the first British female individual Winter Olympics gold medallist since Jeannette Altwegg in 1952.

Williams was a contestant in the second series of the ITV show 71 Degrees North in late 2011.  She finished the series in third place. She has also appeared in the CBBC series, 12 Again.

Post-retirement
On 1 May 2012, Williams announced her retirement from skeleton and said her injuries were behind her quitting the sport.

In January 2013, BBC Two announced Williams as a co-presenter on the 35th series of Ski Sunday.

When approached by Tony Jardine, a motorsports pundit and part-time rally driver, Williams agreed to co-drive a Honda Civic, with the aim of competing in Rally GB. After gaining her licence, the pair successfully trained and qualified to compete in the 2013 Wales Rally GB.

As well as taking up a new role as TeamGB Ambassador, with Robin Cousins, she has also taken a commentator role with the BBC Sport commentating team, specialising in the ice sports of skeleton and bobsleigh.

On 25 April 2014, it was announced that Williams would replace Rachel Riley as a presenter on Channel 5's The Gadget Show. For the 2017 series of the show, Williams decided to leave to care for her child.

In August 2015, Williams married Craig Ham.

In 2018 she was part of the BBC's team providing coverage on the 2018 Winter Olympics. In October 2019, Williams was appointed as the first Ambassador of the Dame Kelly Holmes Trust, a charity that enables former athletes to mentor and support disadvantaged young people.

In June 2022, Williams co-presented the ITV4 coverage of the 2022 Isle of Man TT, along with Matt Roberts, Steve Plater and Cameron Donald.

Awards and honours
Williams was appointed Member of the Order of the British Empire (MBE) in the 2010 Birthday Honours. She was installed as an Honorary Freeman of the City of Bath on 5 June 2010.

References

External links

 
 
 
 

1982 births
Alumni of the University of Bath
English Olympic medallists
English female skeleton racers
Living people
Medalists at the 2010 Winter Olympics
Members of the Order of the British Empire
Olympic gold medallists for Great Britain
Olympic medalists in skeleton
Olympic skeleton racers of Great Britain
People educated at Beechen Cliff School
Sportspeople from Bath, Somerset
Sportspeople from Cambridge
Skeleton racers at the 2010 Winter Olympics
Team Bath winter athletes
Universiade medalists in skeleton
Universiade silver medalists for Great Britain
Competitors at the 2005 Winter Universiade